Mohammad Farid bin Khazali (born 31 March 1998) is a Malaysian professional footballer who plays as a winger for Malaysia Super League club Perak.

Club career

Perak
Farid began his career with Perak's youth team before been promoted to first team in 2020. On 11 March 2020, he made his Malaysia Super League debut for Perak in a 2–0 win over Petaling Jaya City.

References

External links 
 

1998 births
Living people
People from Perak
Malaysian footballers
Association football midfielders
Perak F.C. players
Malaysia Super League players